Bhanujeet Sudan (born 14 April 1981) is an Indian model and television actor who made his debut in 2006 show Bhabhi in the lead role of Nihaal. He has appeared on the show Pavitra Rishta as Rishabh, SuperCops vs Supervillains, Itna Karo Na Mujhe Pyaar as Babu, Ye Hai Mohabbatein as Subbhu and Adaalat as Sanjay Rathore. He is the younger brother of model Inder Mohan Sudan. Bhanujeet, also a model has walked the ramp for designers Tarun Tahiliani, Manish Malhotra and Ritu Beri.

Television

Music videos

References

External links
 

1981 births
Living people
Indian male television actors
Indian male film actors
Indian male models
21st-century Indian male actors
Male actors from New Delhi
Male actors from Kolkata